Kettingspruit Dam is a dam on a tributary of the Ketting Spruit, Mpumalanga, South Africa. It was established in 2006.

See also
List of reservoirs and dams in South Africa
List of rivers of South Africa

References 
 List of South African Dams from the Department of Water Affairs and Forestry (South Africa)

Dams in South Africa
Dams completed in 2006
21st-century architecture in South Africa